Amrit Gope (born 12 September 1999) is an Indian professional footballer who plays as a goalkeeper for Bengaluru in the Indian Super League.

Club career

Jamshedpur B
Gope, first tasted senior competitive football with Jamshedpur B in the 2018–19 season. On 13 January 2019, he made his debut for the reserve team, against TRAU, in a 1–0 loss. He played a combined 12 matches for them in the I-League 2nd Division, over two seasons.

Gope got promoted to the senior team ahead of the 2019–20 season, after impressive performances in between the sticks with the reserves team.

TRAU
Having worked his way up from the Jamshedpur B, Gope signed for TRAU on a one-year deal. On 9 January 2021, he made his debut for the club, against Aizawl in a 1–0 win, riding on some valiant goalkeeping by Gope himself.

Gope extended his contract with TRAU ahead of the 2021–22 season.

Career statistics

Club

References

1999 births
Living people
Indian footballers
Association football goalkeepers
TRAU FC players
Bengaluru FC players